Gunnar Olsson (10 July 1904 – 16 September 1983) was a Swedish film actor and director. He was born in Oxelösund, Sweden.

Partial filmography

Actor

 En melodi om våren (1933) - Delling
 Perhaps a Poet (1933) - Viding
 Tystnadens hus (1933) - Count von Elbing
 The Atlantic Adventure (1934) - Bob Holgert, Machinist
 Marodörer (1934) - Räven
 Järnets män (1935) - Engineer (uncredited)
 Flickor på fabrik (1935) - Erik Löfstedt
 Alla tiders Karlsson (1936) - Film Director
 Bombi Bitt och jag (1936) - Nils Gallilé
 The Two of Us (1939) - Bogren (uncredited)
 ...som en tjuv om natten (1940) - Gren
 Hanna in Society (1940) - Sundin (uncredited)
Lucky Young Lady (1941) - Salesman
 The Case of Ingegerd Bremssen (1942) - Nilsson
 Blizzard (1944) - Kristoffer
 The Old Clock at Ronneberga (1944) - Clock salesman
 The Happy Tailor (1945) - Parish constable (uncredited)
 Harald the Stalwart (1946) - Bosse
 Vagabond Blacksmiths (1949) - Lind
 The Girl from the Third Row (1949) - Lilja, Jeweller
 Bohus Battalion (1949) - Sebastian Tonérus
 Skipper in Stormy Weather (1951) - Birger Birgersson
 Summer Interlude (1951) - The Priest
 Vägen till Klockrike (1953) - Ahlbom, cigar maker
 Stupid Bom (1953) - Julius, gardener
 Seger i mörker (1954) - Anders Persson
 Young Summer (1954) - Cantor
 Laugh Bomb (1954) - Professor Planius
 Gabrielle (1954) - Engkvist (uncredited)
 Voyage in the Night (1955) - Johan - Britt-Marie's Father
 The Seventh Seal (1957) - Albertus Pictor, Church Painter
 Gårdarna runt sjön (1957) - Gardener
 Som man bäddar... (1957) - Professor
 No Tomorrow (1957) - Toivo Hietari
 Wild Strawberries (1957) - Bishop (uncredited)
 Woman in a Fur Coat (1958) - Forensic Chemist
 The Jazz Boy (1958) - Paul Merzbach, filmregissören
 Pirates on the Malonen (1959) - Karl Scholke
 A Lion in Town (1959) - Pawn Broker
 On a Bench in a Park (1960) - Vicar (uncredited)
 The Mistress (1962) - The Old Man (uncredited)
 Adamsson i Sverige (1966) - Persson
 Deadline (1971) - Kent-Arne's Father
 Gangsterfilmen (1974) - Karl

Director 
 The People of Bergslagen (1937)
 We at Solglantan (1939)
 Lasse-Maja (1941)
 Adventurer (1942)
 Turn of the Century (1944)
 Skipper in Stormy Weather (1951)

References

External links

1904 births
1983 deaths
People from Oxelösund Municipality
Swedish male film actors
Swedish film directors
20th-century Swedish male actors